The Tunisian national basketball team, nicknamed Les Aigles de Carthage (The Eagles of Carthage or The Carthage Eagles), is the national basketball team of Tunisia. The team is governed by the Tunisia Basketball Federation (FTBB).

When Tunisia became the 2011 African Basketball Champion, it was the first North African country to do so in almost 30 years. To date, the team has made 22 appearances at the FIBA Africa Championship, ranking it behind only traditional African powers Senegal, Côte d'Ivoire, and Egypt, in total appearances.

History
In 2011, they won their first ever FIBA Africa Championship, after beating Angola in the final. Their previous best finish was at the FIBA Africa Championship 1965, when they won the silver medal as the host country. They also won a bronze medal at the FIBA Africa Championship 1970 and FIBA Africa Championship 1974.

Although the Tunisians never finished worse than eighth in any of their succeeding appearances, they were not able to break onto the podium again until a surprise bronze medal run at the FIBA Africa Championship 2009.  Led by All-Tournament First Team forward Amine Rzig, the Tunisians went 4–2 in the preliminary rounds, winning three games by two points or less.  They reached the semi-finals for only the second time since 1974, by another slim margin – this time a one-point victory over Mali.  Although they were defeated by Angola in the semi-finals, the Tunisians topped Cameroon in the bronze medal game, to claim Africa's third and final automatic berth in the 2010 FIBA World Championship – its first ever FIBA World Cup berth.  The Tunisians struggled to compete in the World Championship, losing all five of their games, and finishing last in Group B, and 24th overall. Yet, after almost forty years of mediocrity in Africa, Tunisia has become one of the continent's prime competitors again. Its appearances at the global stage have become a new milestone in the team's history.

Competitive record
Unlike other team sports, where Tunisia is well positioned at the regional level, the Tunisian men's basketball team has not managed to expand its list of trophies even if at the continental level it can consider among the most awarded countries. Finalist of the African championship held in home in 1965, four times third and twice fourth, Tunisia did not succeed in becoming African champion of the discipline until 2011 without however maintaining its rank since, during the following edition, it is relegated to 9th place.

At the Arab level, the prize list is more extensive with four champion titles, in 1981, 1983, 2008 and 2009, a second place and three third places. On 28 August 2011, the team won the AfroBasket for the first time after defeating Angola 67–56 in the final and qualified for the 2012 Summer Olympics.

In 2017 as co-hosts, Tunisia won its second AfroBasket by beating Nigeria 77–65 in the final. It retains its title in 2021 by beating Ivory Coast in the final with a score of 78–75. On 16 February 2022, Tunisia lost the final of the 2022 Arab Championship against Lebanon 69–72 in the United Arab Emirates.

Olympic Games

FIBA Basketball World Cup

AfroBasket

African Games

Arab Championship

Pan Arab Games

Mediterranean Games

Islamic Solidarity Games

Others

FIBA Stanković Cup

King's Cup

Czech Republic Basketball Tournament

Team

Current roster
Roster for the 2023 FIBA World Cup Qualifiers matches on 26, 27 and 28 August 2022 against Egypt, Senegal and DR Congo.

Depth chart

All Time Head coaches

Kit

Manufacturer
2015 – Nike

Sponsor
2015 – Tunisie Telecom

See also

Tunisia A' national basketball team
Tunisia women's national basketball team
Tunisia men's national under-20 basketball team
Tunisia national under-19 basketball team
Tunisia national under-17 basketball team
Tunisia women's national under-20 basketball team
Tunisia women's national under-19 basketball team
Tunisia women's national under-17 basketball team
Tunisia national 3x3 team
Tunisia women's national 3x3 team
Tunisia Basketball Federation

References

External links

FIBA profile
Tunisia Basketball Records at FIBA Archive
Afrobasket – Tunisia Men National Team

Videos
Olympic Basketball Tournament – Team Tunisia Youtube.com video

Men's national basketball teams
Basketball in Tunisia
Men
Basketball
1956 establishments in Tunisia